The Chairmen of the Board, later reissued as Give Me Just a Little More Time, is the debut album by the soul group Chairmen of the Board.

Track listing

Side one
"Give Me Just a Little More Time" (Edith Wayne, Ron Dunbar) – 2:38
"Come Together" (John Lennon, Paul McCartney) – 3:50
"Bless You" (Norman Johnson, Ron Dunbar) – 2:49
"Patches" (Norman Johnson, Ron Dunbar) – 3:31
"Since the Days of Pigtails & Fairytales" (Edith Wayne, Ron Dunbar) – 2:41
"I'll Come Crawling" (Edith Wayne, Ron Dunbar) – 2:38

Side two
"(You've Got Me) Dangling on a String" (Edith Wayne, Ron Dunbar) – 3:00
"Bravo, Hooray" (Norman Johnson) – 3:12
"Didn't We" (Jimmy Webb) – 2:41
"Feelin' Alright?" (Dave Mason) – 3:40
"My Way" (Claude François, Jacques Revaux, Paul Anka) – 3:57
"Tricked & Trapped" (Edith Wayne, Ron Dunbar) – 3;20

Personnel
Chairmen of the Board
Danny Woods
General Johnson
Eddie Custis
Harrison Kennedy
Technical
Tony Camillo - arrangements
Lawrence Horn - engineer

References

1970 debut albums
Chairmen of the Board albums
Invictus Records albums